Thieves Quartet is a 1993 American thriller film directed by Joe Chappelle and starring  Michele Cole and James Denton.

Premise
In Chicago, four desperate criminals kidnap a businessman's daughter, only to find their plans unravel.

Cast
Phillip Van Lear as Jimmy Fuqua
Joe Guastaferro as Art Bledsoe
Michele Cole as Jessica Sutter
James "Ike" Eichling as Mike Quinn
Richard Henzel as Morgan Luce
Jamie Denton as Ray Higgs
Dawn Maxey as Jill Luce

Reception
Steven Gaydos of Variety wrote that the film features "first-rate performances" but has "a routine, by-the-numbers plot".  Stephen Holden of The New York Times wrote, "Although a standard genre movie with film-noir overtones, it nevertheless has a conviction that is missing in many of its slicker Hollywood forerunners."

References

External links

1994 films
1994 thriller films
American thriller films
Films set in Chicago
Films scored by John Zorn
Films directed by Joe Chappelle
1994 directorial debut films
1993 thriller films
1990s English-language films
1990s American films